The Dan Snyder Memorial Trophy is awarded each year to an Ontario Hockey League player who is a positive role model, and makes a notable humanitarian contribution within his community. Originally known as the OHL Humanitarian of the Year award, it was renamed in honour of former Owen Sound Platers captain Dan Snyder, who died from injuries sustained in an automobile accident in October 2003. Each winner is also nominated for the CHL Humanitarian of the Year award.

Winners
List of recipients of the Dan Snyder Memorial Trophy (2004 to present), and the OHL Humanitarian of the Year award (1993 to 2003).
 Blue background denotes also named CHL Humanitarian of the Year

See also
 QMJHL Humanitarian of the Year
 Doug Wickenheiser Memorial Trophy – Western Hockey League Humanitarian of the Year
 List of Canadian Hockey League awards

References

External links
 Ontario Hockey League

Ontario Hockey League trophies and awards
Humanitarian and service awards
Awards established in 1993